Ogibnoye is a rural locality (a selo) and the administrative center of Ogibnyanskoye Rural Settlement, Chernyansky District, Belgorod Oblast, Russia. The population was 664 as of 2010. There are 10 streets.

Geography 
Ogibnoye is located 30 km northwest of Chernyanka (the district's administrative centre) by road. Volkovo is the nearest rural locality.

References 

Rural localities in Chernyansky District